The West African Power Pool (WAPP) is a cooperation of the national electricity companies in Western Africa under the auspices of the Economic Community of West African States (ECOWAS). The members of WAPP are working for establishing a reliable power grid for the region and a common market for electricity. It was founded in 2010.

Location
Since 2006, the headquarters of WAPP are located at Zone des Ambassades, PK 606 BP 2907, in Cotonou, the capital city of the Republic of Benin. The geographical coordinates of the headquarters of WAPP are 6°21'43.0"N, 2°29'25.0"E (Latitude:6.361944; Longitude:2.490278).

Overview
Member countries are Benin, Burkina Faso, Ghana, Guinea, Guinea Bissau, Ivory Coast, Liberia, Mali, Niger, Nigeria, The Gambia, Togo, Senegal, and Sierra Leone.

The WAPP integrates the national power systems into a unified regional electricity market and aims to promote trade of electricity among the ECOWAS member States – with the expectation that such mechanism would, over the medium to long-term, ensure the citizens of ECOWAS Member States with a stable and reliable electricity supply at affordable costs. A number of WAPP priority projects identified in the Master Plan are currently being implemented, including the Gouina Hydroelectric Power Station, the CLSG Interconnector and Riviera-Prestea Interconnector Project. Feasibility studies have been initiated for a number of other identified priority projects, namely the Fomi Hydroelectric Power Station, Kassa B Hydroelectric Power Station and Souapiti Hydroelectric Power Station. The current ongoing investment program of the WAPP is dictated by the 2019 – 2033 ECOWAS Master Plan for the development of Regional Power Generation and Transmission Infrastructure that was prepared with the support of the European Union and approved in December 2018 by the Authority of the ECOWAS Heads of State and Government through Supplementary Act A/SA.4/12/18.  The Master Plan contains seventy-five (75#) priority projects of which twenty-eight (28#) are transmission line projects. Currently nine (9#) countries (Benin, Burkina Faso, Côte d’Ivoire, Ghana, Mali, Niger, Nigeria, Senegal and Togo) are interconnected and construction is ongoing to interconnect the remaining mainland countries namely Sierra Leone, Liberia, Guinea, Guinea Bissau and The Gambia by 2022.

History
The West African Power Pool (WAPP) was created on 5 December 1999 at the 22nd summit of the ECOWAS Authority of Heads of State and Government. On 18 January 2006, the 29th summit of the ECOWAS Authority of Heads of State and Government held in Niamey, Niger, adopted the Articles of Agreement for WAPP organization and function. Since 2006, the headquarters of WAPP is based in Cotonou, Benin.

Members

See also

 Southern African Power Pool 
 Eastern Africa Power Pool
 North African Power Pool
 Eastern Africa Power Pool

References

External links
 West African Power Pool official website

Energy in Africa
Electricity markets
Organizations established in 1999